Stefan Vuksanović (born September 4, 1998), better known by his YouTube channel name Mudja, is a Serbian YouTuber, internet personality, gamer, entertainer and a live streamer on YouTube. For a very long time, Stefan was the biggest Serbian YouTuber. Stefan is the first Serbian YouTuber to reach 1 million subscribers.

Personal life 
Stefan Vuksanović was born on September 4, 1998, in Požarevac, FR Yugoslavia. His father Saša Vuksanović is an interior designer, and his mother is Vesna Vuksanović. Before YouTube, Stefan was growing up in poor conditions, living inside a leaking house. With power of YouTube, he managed to make a better living for himself and his family. The name for his YouTube channel originates from his grandpa, when Stefan was younger, people mocked him for his nickname. Stefan finished primary and high school in Kostolac. He is in a relationship with another Serbian YouTuber known as Jana Dačović.

Career 
Vuksanović created his first YouTube video when he was only 15 years old. He also managed to get his father Saša to help and create videos with him for YouTube. His YouTube channel name was named SuperSRBGamer, until November 12, 2013 when he changed his YouTube name to Mudja. In 2014, Vuksanović and his father started recording gaming videos, and the first video game they recorded together was the football game PES. He and his father are primarily known for their GTA 5 videos.

In 2016, Vuksanović was featured on the Junior Gaming League, alongside YouTubers SerbianGamesBL, MarkoKOFS, BloodMaster, and FullTV.

In 2017, Vuksanović and his father were at the Balkan Tube Festival in Belgrade, alongside other YouTubers such as Marija Žeželj, Miloš HD, SupremeNexus and many others. Vuksanović also had two famous Serbian singers, Vuk Mob and Gasttozz, as his guests for one of his videos, where the two singers were competing against each other in the video game GTA V.

In 2018, Vuksanović was brought to the Reboot InfoGamer festival in Zagreb. In the same year, Stefan with his father managed to raise awareness and money, for a humanitarian action of the ill 3-year old girl Nikolina.

In 2019, Vuksanović was brought by Coca-Cola and Lvl8 to the Gaming in the Sky festival in Zagreb. It was also revealed that his YouTube channel name is one of the most searched terms in Serbia on YouTube, alongside Zadruga, Rasta, Baka Prase etc. In the same year, Vuksanović toured in Niš, Serbia, along the Dijamant sponsor with a caravan vehicle, other YouTubers were included as well Baka Prase, Stuberi and Yasserstain.

See also
 Video game genre
 List of video game genres

References

1998 births
Living people
People from Požarevac
21st-century Serbian people
Comedy YouTubers
Commentary YouTubers
Gaming-related YouTube channels
Gaming YouTubers
Serbian YouTubers
Let's Players
Video game commentators
Vlogs-related YouTube channels
YouTube channels launched in 2013
YouTube vloggers